The Moisant Aviation School was a school in the early days of aviation founded by Alfred Moisant at Hempstead, Long Island, New York. Alfred and his brother John Bevins Moisant formed the Moisant International Aviators, a flying circus which toured the United States, Mexico and El Salvador. John had learned to fly in France with Louis Bleriot but died in 1910 in an accident. The school had six Bleriot monoplanes equipped with 50 horse power Gnome motors.

Many early aviators learned to fly or perfected their skills at this school, among them Harriet Quimby first American pilot, Matilde E. Moisant, John's and Alfred's sister and the second woman to obtain a pilot's license in the United States, the Aldasoro brothers Juan Pablo and Eduardo, two Mexican pilots who had started to fly gliders in 1909, Dante Nannini Sandoval, first Guatemalan Pilot, and Bernetta Adams Miller, the fifth licensed woman pilot in the U.S.  Under the auspices of the school, Bernetta Miller demonstrated the Moisant/Bleriot monoplane to the U.S. Army in October, 1912, and subsequently made an unsuccessful attempt on the women's altitude record.

An instructor at the school, Albert Jewell disappeared on 13 October 1913 on flight from the Hempstead airfield to Oakwood, Staten Island, NY to take part in an air race; he is assumed to have come down at sea off the south shore of Long Island.

References

Aviation schools in the United States